The Bureau of Prohibition (or Prohibition Unit) was the United States federal law enforcement agency formed to enforce the National Prohibition Act of 1919, commonly known as the Volstead Act, which enforced the 18th Amendment to the United States Constitution regarding the prohibition of the manufacture, sale, and transportation of alcoholic beverages. When it was first established in 1920, it was a unit of the Bureau of Internal Revenue. On April 1, 1927, it became an independent entity within the Department of the Treasury, changing its name from the Prohibition Unit to the Bureau of Prohibition. In 1930, it became part of the Department of Justice. By 1933, with the repeal of Prohibition imminent, it was briefly absorbed into the FBI, or "Bureau of Investigation" as it was then called, and became the Bureau's "Alcohol Beverage Unit," though, for practical purposes it continued to operate as a separate agency. Very shortly after that, once repeal became a reality, and the only federal laws regarding alcoholic beverages being their taxation, it was switched back to Treasury, where it was renamed the Alcohol Tax Unit.

Mission
The Bureau of Prohibition's main function was to stop the sale and consumption of alcohol. Agents would be tasked with eliminating illegal bootlegging rings, and became notorious in cities like New York and Chicago for raiding popular nightclubs. Agents were often paid low wages, and the Bureau was notorious for allowing many uncertified people to become agents. Doing so strengthened the bureau, as they were able to hire agents in greater numbers. In 1929, the Increased Penalties Act or Jones Law was passed. The Jones Law increased penalties for violations previously set in the Volstead Act. First time offenders were now expected to serve a maximum of five years and a $10,000 fine as opposed to the previous six months and $1,000 fine. This strengthened animosity toward Prohibition agents, as many of them (such as Major Maurice Campbell, Prohibition administrator of New York City), were already hated for their raids on popular clubs frequented by New York City's elite.

Famous agents
Its investigators were called prohibition agents, or more colloquially 'Prohis' . Its most famous agent was Eliot Ness. Some of the other famous lawmen who, at some point, carried a Prohi's badge include former Texas Ranger Frank Hamer, full-blooded Cherokee Tom Threepersons, James L. "Lone Wolf" Asher, Chicagoan Pat Roche, and Richard James "Two-Gun" Hart, the eldest brother of Al Capone, who had lost communication with his family at age 16, after fleeing New York City, following a gang brawl.

The two-agent team of Isidor "Izzy" Einstein and Moe Smith, working out of the New York City office, compiled the best arrest record in the history of the agency. Izzy and Moe, as they would later be called, had 4,932 arrests while confiscating over five million bottles of alcohol. The duo would disguise themselves as street vendors, fishermen and many other undercover roles. Both investigators were also able to speak multiple languages, and this skill was also helpful when they were working undercover. The first woman agent was Georgia Hopley.

The Untouchables 
The Untouchables were by far the most famous group of prohibition agents, because they were tasked with capturing infamous gangster Al Capone. They earned their nickname after members of the Chicago Outfit repeatedly failed to bribe or intimidate them, proving they were not as easily corrupted as other prohibition agents. Through their efforts, Capone was indicted on 5000 separate counts of conspiracy to violate the National Prohibition Act, though it was ultimately decided not to bring these charges to trial, but rather to concentrate on income tax violations. Nevertheless, the Untouchables gained national acclaim, in particular, Eliot Ness, who ran the group.

Corruption and public opinion
Despite their mandate to stop consumption of alcohol, many prohibition agents reportedly accepted bribes in exchange for ignoring illegal trade in liquor, which has been ascribed, in part, to their relatively low wages. It was rumored that many agents imbibed the alcohol which they were responsible for confiscating. The public perception of Bureau agents was not favorable. Some prohibition agents became notorious for killing innocent civilians and harassing minor bootleggers, while ignoring gangsters and their rich customers.

Bureau of Alcohol, Tobacco, and Firearms

On July 1, 1930, the Prohibition Bureau was transferred from the Treasury Department to the Department of Justice.  Early in 1933, as part of the Franklin D. Roosevelt-sponsored Omnibus Crime Bill, the Prohibition Bureau was briefly absorbed into the Federal Bureau of Investigation (FBI), or Division of Investigation as the agency was then called. At this point, it became the Alcohol Beverage Unit.  Though part of the FBI on paper, J. Edgar Hoover, who wanted to avoid liquor enforcement and the taint of corruption that was attached to it, continued to operate it as a separate, autonomous agency in practice.

Following the repeal of Prohibition in December 1933, the Alcohol Beverage Unit was removed from the FBI and the Justice Department, and returned to Treasury, where, coming full circle, it became the Alcohol Tax Unit of the IRS, ultimately evolving into the Bureau of Alcohol, Tobacco, and Firearms, or ATF. The present-day ATF deals mostly against illegal firearms, explosives and conducts arson investigations.

In the wake of the September 11, 2001 terrorist attacks, President George W. Bush signed into law the Homeland Security Act of 2002. In addition to the creation of the Department of Homeland Security, the law shifted the ATF from the Department of the Treasury to the Department of Justice. The agency's name was changed to the Bureau of Alcohol, Tobacco, Firearms, and Explosives, or BATFE; however, it continues to be referred to as the ATF.

The task of collecting federal tax revenue derived from the production of tobacco and alcohol products and the regulatory function related to protecting the public in issues related to the production of alcohol, previously handled by the ATF and the IRS, was transferred to the newly established Alcohol and Tobacco Tax and Trade Bureau (TTB), which remained within the Treasury Department. These changes took effect January 24, 2003.

In popular culture
 Eliot Ness’s memoir, The Untouchables, went on to become a bestseller and was later adapted into two television series (in 1959 and 1993) and a feature film.
 Izzy and Moe, a TV-movie starring Jackie Gleason and Art Carney, was loosely based on the real life Isador Einstein and Moe Smith.
 The Bureau of Prohibition is featured prominently in the HBO period crime series Boardwalk Empire, particularly through the character of Agent Nelson Van Alden.

See also

 Drug Enforcement Administration
 Jouett Shouse
 Mabel Walker Willebrandt
 United States House Committee on Alcoholic Liquor Traffic
 William Harvey Thompson

References

External links
 
 
 
 
 "Bureau of Alcohol, Tobacco, Firearms and Explosives." ATF. N.p., 29 Dec. 2008. Web. 16 Oct. 2013. <
 
 
 "Prohibition." Prohibition. N.p., n.d. Web. 16 Oct. 2013. <http://mailer.fsu.edu/~jmrichar/amh1000/fa02/prohibition.htm.

Prohibition
Prohibition
Prohibition in the United States
Prohibition